Asian Latin Americans or Latinasians are Latin Americans of Asian descent. Asian immigrants to Latin America have largely been from East Asia or West Asia. Historically, Asians in Latin America have a centuries-long history in the region, starting with Filipinos in the 16th century. The peak of Asian immigration occurred in the 19th and 20th centuries. There are currently more than four million Asian Latin Americans, nearly 1% of Latin America's population. Chinese, Japanese and the Lebanese are the largest Asian ancestries; other major ethnic groups include Syrians, Indians, Koreans and Filipinos. Brazil is home to the largest population of East Asian descent, estimated at 2.08 million. The country is also home is a large percentage of West Asian descendants. With as much as 5% of their population having some degree of Chinese ancestry, Peru has the highest ratio of any country for East Asian descent. Though the most recent official census, which relied on self-identification, gave a much lower percentage.

There has been notable emigration from these communities in recent decades, so that there are now hundreds of thousands of people of Asian Latin American origin in both Japan and the United States.

History

The first Asian Latin Americans were Filipinos who made their way to Latin America (primarily to Cuba and Mexico and secondarily to Colombia, Panama and Peru) in the 16th century, as slaves, crew members, and prisoners during the Spanish colonial rule of the Philippines through the Viceroyalty of New Spain, with its capital in Mexico City. For two and a half centuries (between 1565 and 1815) many Filipinos and Chinese sailed on the Manila-Acapulco Galleons, assisting in the Spanish Empire's monopoly in trade. Some of these sailors never returned to the Philippines and many of their descendants can be found in small communities around Baja California, Sonora, Mexico City, Peru and others, thus making Filipinos the oldest Asian ethnic group in Latin America.

While South Asians had been present in various forms in Latin America for centuries by the 1800s, it was in this century that the flow into the region spiked dramatically. This rapid influx of hundreds of thousands of mainly male South Asians was due to the need for indentured servants. This is largely tied to the abolition of black slavery in the Caribbean colonies in 1834. Without the promise of free labor and a hostile working class on their hands, the Dutch colonial authorities had to find a solution – cheap Asian labor.

Many of these immigrant populations became such fixtures in their adopted countries that they acquired names of their own. For example, the Chinese men who labored in agricultural work became known as "coolies". While these imported Asian laborers were initially just replacement for agricultural slave labor, they gradually began to enter other sectors as the economy evolved. Before long, they had entered more urban work and the service sector. In certain areas, these populations assimilated into the minority populations, adding yet another definition to go on a casta.

In some areas, these new populations caused conflict. In Northern Mexico, tensions became inevitable when the United States began to shut off Chinese immigration in the early 1880s. Many who were originally bound for the United States were re-routed to Mexico. The rapid increase in population and rise to middle/upper class standing generated strong resentment among existing residents. These tensions lead to riots. In the state of Sonora, the entire Chinese population was expelled in 1929.

Today, the overwhelming majority of Asian Latin Americans are either of East Asian (namely Chinese, Japanese or Korean), or West Asian descent (mostly the Lebanese or Syrians). Many of whom arrived during the second half of the 1800s and the first half of the 1900s. Japanese migration mostly came to a halt after World War II (with the exception of Japanese settlement in the Dominican Republic), while Korean migration mostly came to an end by the 1980s and Chinese migration remains ongoing in a number of countries.

Settlement of war refugees has been extremely minor: a few dozen ex-North Korean soldiers went to Argentina after the Korean War and some Hmong went to French Guiana after the Vietnam War.

Roles in labor
Asian Latin Americans served various roles during their time as low wage workers in Latin America. In the second half of the nineteenth century, nearly a quarter of a million Chinese migrants in Cuba worked primarily on sugar plantations. The Chinese "coolies" who migrated to Peru took up work on the Andean Railroad or the Guano Fields. Over time the Chinese progressed to acquiring work in urban centers as tradesmen, restaurateurs and in the service industry. By the second decade of the nineteenth century, approximately 25,000 Chinese migrants in Mexico found relative success with small businesses, government bureaucracy, and intellectual circles. In the 1830s, the British and Dutch colonial governments also imported South Asians to work as indentured servants to places such as Trinidad and Tobago, Suriname, Curaçao and British Guiana (later renamed Guayana). At the turn of the nineteenth and twentieth centuries, Japanese immigrants reached Brazil and Peru. Much like the Chinese, the Japanese often worked as indentured servants and low wage workers for planters. Japanese work contracts were notably more short term than those of the Chinese and the process was closely monitored by the Japanese government to dissuade abuse and foul play. In both cases, the influx of Asian migrant workers was to fill the void left in the Latin American work forces after the abolition of slavery. Employers of all kinds were desperate for a low cost replacement for their slaves so those who did not participate in any illegal slave operations turned to the Asian migrants.

Geographic distribution

Four and a half million Latin Americans (almost 1% of the total population of Latin America) are of Asian descent. The number may be millions higher, even more so if all who have partial ancestry are included. For example, Asian Peruvians are estimated at 5% of the population there, but one source places the number of all Peruvians with at least some Chinese ancestry at 5 million, which equates to 20% of the country's total population.

The Chinese are the most populous Asian Latin Americans. Significant populations of Chinese ancestry are found in Peru, Venezuela, Brazil, Colombia, Argentina, Cuba, Dominican Republic, Panama, Nicaragua, Puerto Rico, Mexico and Costa Rica (where they make up about 1% of the total population; or about 9,000 residents). Nicaragua is home to 14,000 ethnic Chinese; the majority reside in Managua and on the Caribbean coast. Smaller communities of Chinese, numbering just in the hundreds or thousands, are also found in Ecuador and various other Latin American countries. Many Latin American countries are home to barrios chinos (Chinatowns).

Most who are of Japanese descent reside in Brazil, Peru, Argentina, Mexico, Bolivia, Colombia and Paraguay. Japanese Peruvians have a considerable economic position in Peru. Many past and present Peruvian Cabinet members are ethnic Asians, but most particularly Japanese Peruvians have made up large portions of Peru's cabinet members and former president Alberto Fujimori is of Japanese ancestry who is currently the only Asian Latin American to have ever served as the head of any Latin American nation (or the second, if taking into account Arthur Chung). Brazil is home to the largest Japanese community outside Japan, numbering about 1.7 million with ancestry alone. Brazil is also home to 10,000 Indians, 5,000 Vietnamese, 4,500 Afghans, 2,900 Indonesians and 1,000 Filipinos.

Korean people are the third largest group of Asian Latin Americans. The largest community of this group is in Brazil (specially in Southeast region) with a population of 51,550. The second largest is in Argentina, with a population of 23,603 and with active Koreatowns in Buenos Aires. More 10,000 in Guatemala, and Mexico, This last with active communities in Monterrey, Guadalajara, Yucatan and Mexico City. More than 1,000 in Chile, Paraguay, Venezuela, Honduras and Peru where Jung Heung-won, a Korean Peruvian, was elected mayor in City of Chanchamayo. He is the first Mayor of Korean origin in Peru and all of Latin America. There are small and important communities (less 1,000 peoples) in Colombia, Cuba, Ecuador, Bolivia, Costa Rica, Panama, Dominican Republic, Uruguay, Puerto Rico and Haiti.

Emigrant communities

Japan

Japanese Brazilian immigrants to Japan numbered 250,000 in 2004, constituting Japan's second-largest immigrant population. Their experiences bear similarities to those of Japanese Peruvian immigrants, who are often relegated to low income jobs typically occupied by foreigners.

United States

In the 2000 US Census, 119,829 Hispanic or Latino Americans identified as being of Asian race alone. In 2006 the Census Bureau's American Community Survey estimated them at 154,694, while its Population Estimates, which are official, put them at 277,704.

Composition

Notable persons
Argentina
Juliana Awada, former First Lady of Argentina, Lebanese Argentine.
Carlos Balá, actor of Lebanese descent.
Yamila Diaz-Rahi, model of Lebanese descent.
Dumbfoundead, rapper Argentine-born Korean American Rapper.
Liu Song, table tennis player; Chinese Argentine.
Ignacio Huang, actor; Taiwanese Argentine.
Hoshitango Imachi, ex-sumo wrestler, Japanese Argentine.
Mario Alberto Ishii, political and mayor of the region José C. Paz, Japanese Argentine.
, actress and model, Korean Argentine.
Chang Sung Kim, actor, Korean Argentine.
María Kodama, writer of Japanese descent.
, martial artist, Japanese Argentine.
 "Señorita Lee"; model, actress and television host; Korean Argentine. 
, martial artist, Japanese Argentine.
Carlos Menem, lawyer and politician, former president of Argentina, Syrian Argentine.
Eduardo Menem, politician and brother of Carlos Menem, Syrian Argentine. 
Jessica Michibata, fashion model; Japanese Argentine.
 producer and TV director, Japanese Argentine.
Leonardo Nam, actor; Korean Argentine. 
Jae Park, Korean American singer-songwriter born in Argentina.
, painter, Japanese Argentine.
María Eugenia Suárez, actress and singer; Japanese Argentine.
Alicia Terada, politician, Japanese Argentine.
Chang Sung Kim, actor, Korean Argentine.
Marco, actor; Korean Argentine.
Chantal Videla, actress, model and singer; Filipino Argentine

Bolivia
 Chi Hyun Chung, politician; Korean Bolivian
 Juan Pereda, politician; Palestinian Bolivian
 Pedro Shimose, poet; Japanese Bolivian

Brazil
 Erica Awano, manga artist; Japanese Brazilian
 Suresh Biswas, adventurer; Indo-Brazilian
 Ken Chang, singer; Chinese Brazilian
 Sérgio Echigo, former footballer; Japanese Brazilian
 Boris Fausto, historian, political scientist and writer; Turkish Brazilian
 Alexandr Fier, chess grandmaster; Japanese Brazilian
 Ashok Gandotra, cricketer; Indo-Brazilian
 Kaio Felipe Gonçalves, striker; Japanese Brazilian
 Luiz Gushiken, union leader and politician; Japanese Brazilian
 Sandro Hiroshi, footballer; Japanese Brazilian
 Hugo Hoyama, tennis player; Japanese Brazilian
 Fabiane Hukuda, judoka; Japanese Brazilian
 Kaisei Ichirō, sumo wrestler; Japanese Brazilian
 Thereza Imanishi-Kari, professor; Japanese Brazilian
 Ryoki Inoue, the world's most prolific writer; Japanese Brazilian
 Vânia Ishii, judoka; Japanese Brazilian
 Cláudio Kano, table tennis player; Japanese Brazilian
 Nathalia Kaur, model and actress; Indian descent
 Reishin Kawai, aikido practitioner and acupuncturist; Japanese Brazilian
 Pedro Ken, footballer; Japanese Brazilian
 Allam Khodair, race car driver; Japanese Lebanese Brazilian
 Felipe Kitadai, judoka; Japanese Brazilian
 Paulinho Kobayashi, footballer; Japanese Brazilian
 Luca Kumahara, table tennis player; Japanese Brazilian
 Yanna Lavigne, actress and model; Japanese Brazilian
 Iara Lee, producer, director and activist; Korean Brazilian
 Gui Lin, table tennis player; Chinese Brazilian
 Lovefoxxx, singer; Japanese Brazilian
 Manabu Mabe, painter; Japanese Brazilian
 Lyoto Machida, mixed martial artist; Japanese Brazilian
 Mitsuyo Maeda, judo master and developer of Brazilian jiu-jitsu; Japanese Brazilian
 Daniel Matsunaga, model, host, actor and footballer; Japanese Brazilian
 Jo Matumoto, former pro baseball player; Japanese Brazilian
 Froilano de Mello, microbiologist; Indo-Brazilian
 Paulo Miyashiro, triathlete; Japanese Brazilian
 Carlos Morimoto, author; Japanese Brazilian
 Andrews Nakahara, MMA fighter; Japanese Brazilian
 Mariana Ohata, triathlete; Japanese Brazilian
 Ruy Ohtake, architect; Japanese Brazilian
 Tomie Ohtake, artist; Japanese Brazilian
 Oscar Oiwa, painter, visual artist and architect; Japanese Brazilian
 Leandro Okabe, model; Japanese Brazilian
 Tetsuo Okamoto, swimmer; Japanese Brazilian
 Poliana Okimoto, long-distance swimmer and gold medalist; Japanese Brazilian
 Pedro Okuda, baseball shortstop; Japanese Brazilian
 Luís Onmura, judoka; Japanese Brazilian
 Hiroo Onoda, former Japanese Army officer; Japanese Brazilian 
 Angela Park, golfer; Korean Brazilian
 Andy Pi, martial artist; Chinese Brazilian
 Rogério Romero, swimmer; Japanese Brazilian
 Lucas Salatta, backstroke swimmer; Japanese Brazilian
 Silvio Santos, television host and entrepreneur; Turkish Brazilian
 Daniella Sarahyba, model; Lebanese descent
 Akihiro Sato, model; Japanese Brazilian
 Sabrina Sato, model; Japanese and Lebanese descent
 Luis Shinohara, former judoka; Japanese Brazilian
 Lígia Silva, table tennis player; Japanese Brazilian
 Marcos Sugiyama, volleyball player; Japanese Brazilian 
 Mahau Suguimati, track hurdler; Japanese Brazilian 
 Jung Mo Sung, lay theologian; Korean Brazilian
 Manabu Suzuki, racer; Japanese Brazilian 
 Rafael Suzuki, racer; Japanese Brazilian 
 Rodrigo Tabata, footballer; Japanese Brazilian 
 Marlon Teixeira, model; Japanese Brazilian 
 Alex Yuwan Tjong, badminton player; Indonesian Brazilian 
 Geovanna Tominaga, television host and actress; Japanese Brazilian 
 Gustavo Tsuboi, table tennis player; Japanese Brazilian 
 Felipe Wu, sport shooter; Chinese Brazilian
 Jenifer Widjaja, tennis player; Indonesian Brazilian
 Stênio Yamamoto, sports shooter; Japanese Brazilian
 Mario Yamasaki, MMA fighter; Japanese Brazilian
 Carlos Yoshimura, baseball pitcher; Japanese Brazilian
 Marcus Tulio Tanaka, football player; Japanese Brazilian

Chile
 Alfonso Leng, composer; Chinese Chilean
 Carlos Ominami, economist and politician; Japanese Chilean
 Rafael Tarud, politician, Palestinian Chilean

Colombia
Shakira, of partial Lebanese descent
Farina, Colombian rapper and reggaeton singer of Peruvian and Lebanese descent.
Yokoi Kenji, speaker; Japanese Colombian.
, ex-soccer player and ex-military; Japanese Colombian.
, Colombian actress, partial Japanese descent.
Yu Takeuchi, mathematical; Japanese Colombian.
, actress and model; Japanese Colombian.
Paublo Ng Choi, Chef, Chinese Colombian.
Laura González, Miss Colombia 2017; Lebanese descent.
Jordy Monroy, footballer, born in Colombia; Armenian origin
Sayaka Osorio, Karateka, Korean Colombian.
Nydia Quintero Turbay, former First Lady of Colombia, Lebanese descent.
Manuel Teodoro, American journalist of Colombian and Filipino descent.
 
Costa Rica
 Franklin Chang-Diaz, former NASA astronaut; Chinese Spanish Costa Rican
 Cheng Siu Chung, retired football player, coach; Chinese Costa Rican
 Eduardo Li, president of the Costa Rican football federation; Chinese Costa Rican
 Harry Shum Jr., actor; Chinese Costa Rican

Cuba
 Fulgencio Batista, former President of Cuba; of partial Chinese heritage
 Yamil Chade, boxing manager; Lebanese Cuban
 Yat-Sen Chang, ballet dancer; Chinese Cuban
 Emilio Estefan, musician; Lebanese Cuban
 Wifredo Lam, artist; Afro-Chinese-Cuban
 Alfredo Abon Lee, army officer; Chinese Cuban
 Jeronimo Lim Kim, Korean Cuban known for being a part of the Cuban Revolution

Dominican Republic
 Elías Wessin y Wessin, politician; Lebanese Dominican
 Wu Xue, table tennis player; Chinese Dominican
 Akari Endo, Japanese-Dominican actress
 Lian "Jenifer" Qian, Chinese Dominican table tennis player

Ecuador
 Li Jian - midfielder; Chinese Ecuadorian
 Jinsop, singer; Korean Ecuadorian
 Alberto Dahik, politician; Lebanese Ecuadorian
 Carlos Moncayo, co-founder and CEO of Asiam; Chinese Ecuadorian
 Jaime Nebot, lawyer and former mayor Guayaquil; Lebanese Ecuadorian
 Julio Teodoro Salem, politician; Lebanese Ecuadorian

El Salvador 
 Hajime Tsujimoto: Environmental activist, economist.
 Takeshi Fujiwara, sprinter and athlete; Japanese Salvadorean
 Hiroyuki Ikeuchi, Japanese Actor of Salvadorean descent.

Guatemala
 Myrna Mack, anthropologist; Chinese and Maya descent
 Helen Mack Chang, businesswoman and human rights activist; Chinese Guatemalan

Honduras
 , journalist and TV host; Chinese Honduran
 Hajime waki, Musician; Japanese Honduran
Fernando Chin: Salesman, first mayor of La Lima. 

Mexico

 Alberto Arai, architect, theorist and writer; Japanese Mexican
 Eduardo Auyón, artist and cultural promoter; Chinese Mexican
 Jesús Chong, boxer; Chinese Mexican
 Miguel Ángel Osorio Chong, secretary of the interior of Mexico; Chinese Mexican
 Axel Didriksson, writer and professor; Japanese Mexican
 Jocelyn Enriquez, singer and songwriter, Filipino Mexican
 Ana Gabriel, Mexican singer and composer; Chinese on her mother's side
 Zhenli Ye Gon, businessman and alleged drug trafficker; Chinese Mexican
 Xóchitl Hamada, pro wrestler; Japanese Mexican
 Hiromi Hayakawa, singer; Japanese Mexican
 Salma Hayek, actress and producer; Lebanese descent
 Gilberto Hirata, state deputy; Japanese Mexican
 Tomoki Kameda, undefeated Boxer; Japanese Mexican
 Su Muy Key, actress and dancer; Chinese Mexican
 Pandurang Sadashiv Khankhoje, revolutionary, scholar, agricultural scientist and historian; Indo-Mexican
 Pablo Larios, goalkeeper; Japanese Mexican
 Juan Manuel Ley, founder and chairman of Casa Ley; Chinese Mexican
 Alejandro Gómez Maganda, politician and former governor of the state of Guerrero; Filipino Mexican
 Eizi Matuda, botanist; Japanese Mexican
 Lyn May, actress, exotic dancer and acrobat; Chinese Mexican
 Patricia Castañeda Miyamoto, swimmer; Japanese Mexican
 Daiwon Moon, martial artist; Korean Mexican
 Kenya Mori, actress; Japanese Mexican
 Noé Murayama, actor; Japanese Mexican
 Úrsula Murayama, actress; Japanese Mexican
 Fumiko Nakashima, artist; Japanese Mexican
 Carlos Nakatani, artist; Japanese Mexican
 Isidoro Montes de Oca, revolutionary general; Filipino Mexican
 Ramón Fabié, revolutionary soldier; Filipino Mexican
 , revolutionary soldier; Filipino Mexican
 Francisco Mongoy, revolutionary soldier; Filipino Mexican
 Kiyoto Ota, sculptor; Japanese Mexican
 Sanjaya Rajaram, agronomist; Indo-Mexican
 M.N. Roy, nationalist revolutionary, radical activist and political theorist; Indo-Mexican
 Catarina de San Juan, the China Poblana; Indo-Mexican
 Sugi Sito, pro wrestler; Chinese Mexican
 Romeo Villalva Tabuena, painter and printmaker; Filipino Mexican
 Nancy Taira, actress; Japanese Mexican
 Huang Yiguang, politician and aviator; Chinese Mexican

Nicaragua
 Arlen Siu, martyr of the 1979 Sandinista revolution; Chinese Nicaraguan
 Zach King, American internet personality, filmmaker, and illusionist; Chinese Nicaraguan

Paraguay
Mario Abdo Benítez, President of Paraguay; Lebanese descent.
Mitsuhide Tsuchida, footballer, Japanese Paraguayan.

Panama
Jorge Cham, web comic creator of Piled Higher and Deeper, Chinese Panamanian.
Bruce Chen, pitcher for the Cleveland Indians, Chinese Panamanian.
Roberto Chen, Panamanian footballer of Chinese descent
Marelissa Him, model, part Chinese on her father's side
Shey Ling Him Gordon, Panama's delegate to the Miss World 2007 competition, Chinese Panamanian. 
Sigrid Nunez, American writer (Chinese-Panamanian father, German mother)
 Mehr Eliezer - Winner of Señorita Panamá 2019, Indian Panamanian.

Peru
 Ernesto Arakaki, footballer; Japanese Peruvian
 José Antonio Chang, former Prime Minister of Peru; Chinese Peruvian 
 Alberto Fujimori, President of Peru from 1990 to 2000; Japanese Peruvian
 Keiko Fujimori, Congresswoman; Japanese Peruvian
 Kenji Fujimori, Congressman; Japanese-Peruvian
 Susana Higuchi, politician and engineer; Japanese Peruvian
 Jorge Hirano, international football player; Japanese Peruvian
 Fernando Iwasaki, writer and historian; Japanese Peruvian
 Haruki Kanashiro, goalkeeper; Japanese Peruvian
 Elena Keldibekova, volleyball player; Kazakh Peruvian
 Valentina Shevchenko, mixed martial artist; Kyrgyz Peruvian
 Humberto Lay, architect and cleric; Chinese Peruvian
 Iván Miranda, tennis player; Chinese Peruvian
 Aldo Miyashiro, artist; Japanese Peruvian
 Augusto Miyashiro, engineer and politician; Japanese Peruvian
 Kaoru Morioka, futsal player; Japanese Peruvian
 Sum Nung, Wing Chun grandmaster; Chinese Peruvian
 José Pereda, retired footballer; Japanese Peruvian
 Víctor Polay, one of the founders of the Túpac Amaru Revolutionary Movement; Chinese Peruvian
 Venancio Shinki, painter; Japanese Peruvian
 Hector Takayama, former footballer; Japanese Peruvian
 Eduardo Tokeshi, artist; Japanese Peruvian
 Tilsa Tsuchiya, artist; Japanese Peruvian
 Edwin Vásquez, Olympic shooter; Chinese Peruvian
 José Watanabe, poet; Japanese Peruvian
 Víctor Joy Way, former Prime Minister of Peru; Chinese Peruvian
 Alan Wong, chef; Chinese Peruvian
 Erasmo Wong, businessman, owner of various retail chains; Chinese Peruvian
 Patty Wong, model; Chinese Peruvian
 Ricardo Wong, politician; Chinese Peruvian
 Rafael Yamashiro, politician; Japanese Peruvian
 César Ychikawa, vocalist; Japanese Peruvian
 David Soria Yoshinari, footballer; Japanese Peruvian
 Jaime Yoshiyama, politician; Japanese Peruvian
 Carlos Yushimito, writer; Japanese Peruvian
 Pedro Zulen, philosopher; Chinese Peruvian

Puerto Rico
 Aravind Enrique Adyanthaya, writer, performer and theater director; Indo-Puerto Rican
 Eduardo Bhatia, politician and senator; Indo-Puerto Rican
 Lakshmi Singh, newscaster on NPR
 Ruth D. Thorne, author; Indo-Puerto Rican
 Bruno Mars, singer, songwriter, record producer, musician and dancer; Filipino and Puerto Rican

Uruguay
 Alberto Abdala, Former Vice-president of Uruguay; Lebanese Uruguayan
 Barbara Mori, Uruguyan-born Mexican actress; Japanese and Lebanese descent

Venezuela
 Fred Armisen, American actor, has Venezuelan roots on his mother and Japanese father's side part; Japanese Venezuelan
 Alex Cabrera Suzuki, Venezuelan first baseman and right-handed batter who played in Major League Baseball and Nippon Professional Baseball; Japanese Venezuelan
 Hana Kobayashi, singer; Japanese Venezuelan
 Kamala Lopez, American actress, director, and political activist (born in New York City but raised in Venezuela); Indian Venezuelan
 Naomi Soazo, Venezuelan judoka; Japanese Venezuelan
 Henry Zakka, Venezuelan actor; Japanese Venezuelan
 Tarek William Saab, Prosecutor General of Venezuela and former ombudsman; Lebanese Venezuelan
 Tareck El Aissami, former Vice President of Venezuela; Lebanese Venezuelan
 Elías Jaua, Minister of Education, former Foreign Minister and Vice President of Venezuela; Lebanese Venezuelan
 Mariam Habach, Miss Venezuela 2015; Syrian descent

See also

 Latin Americans
 Chinese Latin American cuisine

Ethnic groups
 Asian Argentines
 Asian Brazilians
 Asian Mexicans
 Asian Peruvians

 Chinese 
 Chinese Argentines
 Chinese Brazilians
 Chinese people in Chile
 Chinese people in Costa Rica
 Chinese Colombians
 Chinese Cubans
 Ethnic Chinese in the Dominican Republic
 Chinese immigration to Mexico
 Chinese Nicaraguans
 Ethnic Chinese in Panama
 Chinese Peruvians
 Chinese immigration to Puerto Rico
 Chinese Uruguayans
 Chinese Venezuelans

 Filipinos 
 Filipino Cubans
 Filipino immigration to Mexico

 Indians 
 Indians in Argentina
 Indian immigration to Brazil
 Indians in Chile
 Indians in the Dominican Republic
 Indian Mexicans
 Indians in Panama
 Indians in Peru
 Indian Uruguayans
 Indians in Venezuela

 Lebanese 
 Lebanese Argentines
 Lebanese Brazilians
 Lebanese Chileans
 Lebanese Colombians
 Lebanese Ecuadorians
 Lebanese Mexicans
 Lebanese Paraguayans
 Lebanese Uruguayans
 Lebanese Venezuelans

 Japanese 
 Japanese Argentines
 Japanese Bolivians
 Japanese Brazilians
 Japanese Chileans
 Japanese migration to Colombia
 Japanese Cubans
 Japanese settlement in the Dominican Republic
 Japanese Mexicans
 Japanese Paraguayans
 Japanese Peruvians
 Japanese Uruguayans
 Japanese Venezuelans

 Koreans 
 Koreans in Argentina
 Korean Brazilians
 Koreans in Chile
 Korean Colombians
 Koreans in Cuba
 Koreans in Guatemala
 Koreans in Mexico
 Koreans in Paraguay
 Koreans in Peru
 Korean Uruguayans

Asian Latin American enclaves
 Chinatowns in Latin America
 Japantown
 Koreatown

References

Further reading
 Affigne, Tony, and Pei-te Lien. "Peoples of Asian descent in the Americas: Theoretical implications of race and politics." Amerasia Journal 28.2 (2002): 1-27.
 Avila-Tàpies, Rosalia, and Josefina Domínguez-Mujica. "Postcolonial migrations and diasporic linkages between Latin America and Japan and Spain." Asian and Pacific Migration Journal 24.4 (2015): 487–511.
 Chee Beng Tan, and Walton Look Lai, eds. The Chinese in Latin America and the Caribbean (2010) excerpt
 Fu, Puo-An Wu. "Transpacific Subjectivities:" Chinese"--Latin American Literature after Empire." in Chinese America: History and Perspectives (2018): 13-20.
 Hu-Dehart, Evelyn. "The Chinese of Peru, Cuba, and Mexico." in The Cambridge survey of world migration (1995): 220–222.
 Hu-DeHart, Evelyn. "Coolies, Shopkeepers, Pioneers: The Chinese of Mexico and Peru (1849–1930)." Amerasia Journal 15.2 (1989): 91–116.
Hirabayashi, Lane Ryo, Akemi Kikumura-Yano, and James A. Hirabayashi, eds. New worlds, new lives: Globalization and people of Japanese descent in the Americas and from Latin America in Japan. Stanford University Press, 2002.
Hu-DeHart, Evelyn. "Latin America in Asia-Pacific Perspective Evelyn Hu-DeHart." Asian Diasporas: New Formations, New Conceptions (2007): 29+.
Jingsheng, Dong. "Chinese emigration to Mexico and the Sino-Mexico relations before 1910." Estudios Internacionales (2006): 75–88.
 Kikuchi, Hirokazu. "The Representation of East Asia in Latin American Legislatures." Issues & Studies 53.01 (2017): 1740005. doi: 10.1142/S1013251117400057
Kim, Hahkyung. "Korean Immigrants’ Place in the Discourse of Mestizaje: A History of Race-Class Dynamics and Asian Immigration in Yucatán, Mexico." Revista Iberoamericana (2012).
 Lee, Rachel. "Asian American cultural production in Asian-Pacific perspective." boundary 2 26.2 (1999): 231–254. online
 Lim, Rachel. "Racial Transmittances: Hemispheric Viralities of Anti-Asian Racism and Resistance in Mexico." Journal of Asian American Studies 23.3 (2020): 441–457.
Masterson, Daniel M. The Japanese in Latin America. University of Illinois Press, 2004. 0252071441, 9780252071447.
Min, Man-Shik. "Far East Asian immigration into Latin America." Korea & world affairs 11.2 (1987): 331+
 Pan, Lynn, ed. The encyclopedia of the Chinese overseas (Harvard UP, 1998). pp 248–2630.
 Rivas, Zelideth María. "Literary and Cultural Representations of Asians in Latin America and the Caribbean." in Oxford Research Encyclopedia of Literature (2019).
 Romero, Robert Chao, and Kevin Escudero. "“Asian Latinos” and the US Census." AAPI Nexus: Policy, Practice and Community 10, no. 2 (2012): 119-138. online
 Seijas, Tatiana. "Asian migrations to Latin America in the Pacific World, 16th–19th centuries." History Compass 14.12 (2016): 573–581. online
Tigner, James L. "Japanese immigration into Latin America: a survey." Journal of Interamerican Studies and World Affairs 23.4 (1981): 457–482.

External links
 Asian-Latino Intermarriage in The Americas
 The Importance of Being Japanese in Bolivia 

 
 
Ethnic groups in Latin America
Ethnic groups in Central America
Ethnic groups in the Caribbean
Ethnic groups in North America
Ethnic groups in South America
Immigration to North America
Immigration to South America